Redhead is a lost 1919 American silent drama film directed by Charles Maigne and starring Alice Brady, Conrad Nagel and Robert Schable.

The film's sets were designed by the art director William Cameron Menzies.

Cast
 Alice Brady as Dazil Mellows 
 Conrad Nagel as Matthew Thurlow 
 Robert Schable as Roland Gard 
 Charles A. Stevenson as Parker Thurlow 
 Charles Eldridge as Mr. Mellows 
 May Brettone as Mrs. Mellow

References

Bibliography
 Darby, William. Masters of Lens and Light: A Checklist of Major Cinematographers and Their Feature Films. Scarecrow Press, 1991.

External links

1919 films
1919 drama films
Silent American drama films
Lost American films
Films directed by Charles Maigne
American silent feature films
1910s English-language films
American black-and-white films
Selznick Pictures films
1919 lost films
Lost drama films
1910s American films